The DUX-53 and DUX-59 were submachine guns manufactured at the Oviedo Arsenal in Spain. They were based directly on the design of the Finnish 9mm Model 44 submachine gun, which in turn was based on the Soviet PPS-43.

Users 
: Sold to the Bundesgrenzschutz.

References 

Ezell, Edward Clinton (1977). Small Arms of the World, 11th edition. Harrisburg, PA: Stackpole Books. 

9mm Parabellum submachine guns
Military equipment introduced in the 1950s
Submachine guns of Spain